Filipe Abraão (31 December 1979 – 9 January 2019) was an Angolan basketball player. He was a 194 cm (6'4") in height and weighs 88 kg (194 pounds) and played as a small forward.

Abraão also represented the Angolan senior team for the first time at the FIBA Africa Championship 2009. He saw action in five games off the bench for the Angolans, who won their seventh consecutive FIBA Africa Championship and qualified for the 2010 FIBA World Championship.

He last played for Recreativo do Libolo at the Angolan major basketball league BIC Basket.

Abraão died on 9 January 2019 of an undisclosed disease.

References

1979 births
2019 deaths
Basketball players from Luanda
Angolan men's basketball players
Small forwards
Atlético Sport Aviação basketball players
Place of death missing
C.D. Primeiro de Agosto men's basketball players
C.R.D. Libolo basketball players